The British Rail Class 701 Aventra is a class of electric multiple unit passenger train being built for South Western Railway (SWR) by Bombardier Transportation and later Alstom at Derby Litchurch Lane Works. Built on the Aventra platform, they are branded as Arterio trains by SWR, and will operate services on the Reading, Windsor and South West London suburban lines. 

Ordered in 2017, the trains were due to enter service in mid 2019, however several delays have prevented this, with passenger service currently planned for 2023. , 24 units had been accepted by SWR.

History

In March 2017, SWR was awarded the South Western franchise with a commitment to introduce 750 new carriages.
In June 2017, SWR awarded a contract to Bombardier Transportation for 90 Aventra DC EMUs, with 60 ten-car and 30 five-car trains to be introduced from mid 2019 at a cost of £895million. There was an option to purchase a further five ten-car units if required by October 2020. The units will be maintained at Wimbledon depot and the new Feltham depot.

The new trains will eventually replace all of SWR's suburban fleets, which at the time of the order comprised Classes 455, 456, and 707, increasing peak capacity on suburban routes into London Waterloo by 46%. Original plans called for the rollout of the full Class 701 fleet to take two years after the first units entered service.

The order was initially split into two separate classes, with five-car units placed in Class 705 and ten-car units placed in Class 711, but this was later changed to place ten-car units in Class 701 subclass /0 and five-car units in subclass /5.

Following a brief halt to production in March 2020 as a result of the COVID-19 pandemic, the first completed ten-car unit (number 701002) was delivered to Eastleigh Works on 10 June 2020 so that the testing and certification processes could commence. At this point entry into service was already more than five months late. 
By June 2021, only 19 units had been delivered, none of which had been formally accepted by SWR.

In January 2022, SWR announced that continued delays to the Class 701 introduction had "created a challenging situation" on its suburban network, and that it was still waiting for Alstom (which acquired Bombardier Transportation in January 2021) to "supply a train that performs to specification". This caused SWR to extend the lease on its remaining 12  units until late 2022, which in turn delayed their planned transfer to Southeastern. Railway industry journalist Roger Ford observed in January 2022 that the program now met the "ultimate standard for lateness", given that none of the finished units had yet been accepted by SWR and at least 280 vehicles had not yet even been built—while the original contract specified that the entire fleet was to be in service by the end of 2021. He noted that the delay was, in part, due to "endemic software issues" that had affected the introduction of all Aventra fleets to date. Other issues include complaints from driver's union ASLEF that the cab environment in the production units differs unacceptably from the standard previously agreed with SWR, and a high level of manufacturing defects in the finished vehicles.

SWR's Business Plan for 2022–2023, published in July 2022, acknowledged that "continuing problems ... have prevented the start of driver training and delayed the programme of train acceptance", and included a commitment to "introduce the new Arterio fleet as soon as possible". This will involve SWR agreeing on new roll-out milestones for the project with the Department for Transport.

A further update in December 2022 stated that SWR had by then formally accepted 24 finished units and repeated the commitment to introduce the fleet into service "as early in [2023] as possible", though a concurrent statement from the Department for Transport indicated that work to finalise a service-standard software package for the trains was still underway and that driver training had not yet commenced.

Features 
The Class 701 features regenerative braking, wide gangways between coaches, wide doors for ease and efficiency of boarding and alighting, 2+2 seating arrangement throughout, Wi-Fi, at-seat USB charging points, real-time passenger information screens, air conditioning, bicycle spaces (three for each five coaches), and accessible toilets for disabled passengers (one in each five coaches). SWR will also provide a complimentary entertainment service called "SWR|Stream" for passengers with devices connected to the onboard WiFi.

Each five-car train has 274 seats with room for 361 standing passengers, while a ten-car set will seat 556 passengers with space for 746 standing. The trains also feature external door cameras, and monitors within the cab, to allow for Driver Controlled Operation.

Fleet details

Vehicle numbering
Individual vehicles are numbered in the ranges as follows, with the last two digits of each vehicle number matching those of the unit to which the vehicle belongs:

European Vehicle Numbers for the fleet are devised by prefixing the domestic vehicle number with type code 94, country code 70, and a leading zero; thus "94700...".

Illustration

Notes

References

External links 

 Information about the trains from the SWR website

701
Bombardier Transportation multiple units
750 V DC multiple units
Train-related introductions in 2023